Roman Ducksworth Jr. (1934 – April 9, 1962) was an African-American military police officer, shot and killed as a hate crime by Taylorsville, Mississippi police as he was heading to the hospital expecting his sixth child.

Personal life 
Roman Ducksworth Jr. was a military police officer stationed in Maryland, a few months short of finishing ten years service in the army. During his time in service he would send gifts home to his children. Ducksworth had a wife and six children, one of which was born right after his death.

Death and after 
On April 9, 1962 Ducksworth was traveling to a hospital to visit his sick wife and newborn child. He was sleeping on the bus when a police escorted him off due to his race and mistaking him as a freedom rider. A small tussle broke out, the officer drew his gun, and fired into Ducksworth's chest. Ducksworth's sister-in-law and her son were present as he was pronounced dead on the scene.

Initial court proceedings attempted to label Roman as drunk, and the murder as self-defense. The murder was ruled a 'justifiable homicide', and no further justice has been taken upon the case ever since. As a result of the killing, Odell Ducksworth would lose his job at a laundromat a few days later. Following that a cross was seen burning across his street and Odell's family was forced to relocate.

Upon his death Ducksworth received full military honors and a 16-gun salute. Roughly two thousand towns members attended his funeral.
In 1989, the Southern Poverty Law Center has commemorated Roman Ducksworth as a civil rights martyr on a memorial designed by Maya Lin.

References 

1962 deaths
1934 births
Civil rights movement
Racially motivated violence against African Americans